Santa Mónica is a small town of San José Department in southern Uruguay. In 2004 it had a population of 2,561. It is connected to Montevideo by Route 1. Playa Pascual lies just to its southwest. Both Playa Pascual and Santa Mónica, along with other populated segments, have been integrated into the Ciudad del Plata in 2006.

References

External links
INE map of Santa Mónica

Populated places in the San José Department